The Morrison Rocks are a group of rocks which outcrop along the southern slope of Mount Frakes, in the Crary Mountains of Marie Byrd Land, Antarctica. They were mapped by the United States Geological Survey from ground surveys and U.S. Navy aerial photographs, 1959–66, and were named by the Advisory Committee on Antarctic Names for Paul W. Morrison, U.S. Navy, a hospital corpsman at South Pole Station in 1974.

References

Rock formations of Marie Byrd Land
Crary Mountains